A grow box is a partially or completely enclosed system for raising plants indoors or in small areas. Grow boxes are used for a number of reasons, including lack of available outdoor space or the desire to grow vegetables, herbs or flowers during cold weather months. They can also help protect plants against pests or disease.

Grow boxes may be soil-based or hydroponic. The most sophisticated examples are totally enclosed, and contain a built-in grow light, intake and exhaust fan system for ventilation, hydroponics system that waters the plants with nutrient-rich solution, and an odor control filter. These advanced elements allow the gardener to maintain optimal temperature, light patterns, nutrition levels, and other conditions for the chosen plants.

Key growlight options include fluorescent bulbs, which offer relatively limited light output; high-intensity discharge lamps such as sodium-vapor lamps and metal-halide lamps; and light-emitting diodes bulbs, which are becoming more energy-efficient.

In different sizes and degrees of complexity, grow boxes are also referred to as grow cabinets and lightproof cabinets. A full-room version of a grow box is a growroom.

Components 
Grow cabinets have many different pieces of equipment that improve plant growth and yields. The system will usually allow its owner to control all conditions inside the cabinet to make them perfect for growth. Below is a chart of different pieces of equipment on many commercially-built cabinets.

See also 
 Aeroponics
 Growbag
 Growroom
 Ultrasonic Hydroponic Fogger
 Hydroponic dosers
 Hydroponics
 Pot farming

References

External links 

 Barak, P. 2002. Essential Elements for Plant Growth: Hydroponics.
 Hershey, D.R. 1994. Solution culture hydroponics: history and inexpensive equipment. American Biology Teacher 56:111-118.
 Jensen, M.H. 1997. Hydroponics. HortScience 32
 Hydroponics as a Hobby: Growing Plants Without Soil. University of Illinois Circular 844
 Utah State University Hydroponics 
 Hydroponics at McMurdo Station Antarctica
 Cornell University Commercial Hydroponic Lettuce, Spinach and Pak Choi Grower's Handbooks
 Hydroponics and Soilless Cultures on Artificial Substrates as an Alternative to Methyl Bromide Soil Fumigation

Hydroponics
Gardening
Urban agriculture